Van Hees is a Dutch toponymic surname meaning "from Hees". Hees may refer to a number of places, including Heeze (in the past also spelled "Hees") near Eindhoven, a former village and now a neighborhood of Nijmegen, a former village near Utrecht, or Heesch/Heeswijk, a village near Oss. People with this name include:

 Adriaan van Hees (1910–1976), Dutch actor and member of the National Socialist Movement in the Netherlands (NSB)
 Christie Van Hees (born 1977), Canadian racquetball player
  (born 1964), Belgian writer and Marxist politician
 Martin van Hees (born 1964), Dutch philosopher and academic
Variants
 Dimitri van Heesch (born 1970s/1980s), Dutch developer of Doxygen software
 Kai van Hese (born 1989), Dutch footballer

See also 
 Van Hee

References

Dutch-language surnames
Toponymic surnames
Surnames of Dutch origin